TAUT is an acronym or initialism and may refer to:

 Tramways & Urban Transit, a monthly magazine published in the United Kingdom

See also
 Taut, for the word or name